Senator Percy may refer to:

Charles H. Percy (1919–2011), U.S. Senator from Illinois from 1967 to 1985
LeRoy Percy (1860–1929), U.S. Senator from Mississippi from 1910 to 1913